Mount Barnard is a mountain in the U.S. state of California, and has the dubious distinction of being the highest thirteener, a peak between  in elevation, in the United States.

The first ascent was by W. L. Hunter, John Hunter, William Hunter and C. Mulholland on September 25, 1892. They named the peak in honor of E. E. Barnard, a noted astronomer.

References

External links 
 

Mountains of Tulare County, California
Mountains of Inyo County, California
Mountains of Sequoia National Park
Mountains of Northern California